Euxoa acuminifera is a moth of the family Noctuidae. It is found in southern Russia, Turkestan and central Asia.

External links
Fauna Europaea

Euxoa
Moths of Asia
Moths described in 1854